The Metadata Facility for Java is a specification for Java that defines an API for annotating fields, methods, and classes as having particular attributes that indicate they should be processed in specific ways by development tools, deployment tools, or run-time libraries.

The specification was developed under the Java Community Process as JSR 175, and was released as a part of J2SE 5.0 (Tiger).

External links 

 JSR 175 A Metadata Facility for the Java Programming Language
 JSR 250 Common Annotations (defines common Java SE and Java EE annotations)
 JSR 269 Pluggable Annotation Processing API (defines a pluggable interface for developing build-time annotation processors)

Java
Java specification requests